The 2009–10 Penn State Lady Lions basketball team represented Pennsylvania State University in the 2009–10 NCAA Division I women's basketball season. It was the 46th season of Lady Lions basketball. The Lady Lions, a member of the Big Ten Conference, finished the season tied for sixth in the conference. They advanced to the WNIT, losing in the first round to Hofstra.

Offseason
July 21: Julia Trogele recently completed her stint playing with the U20 German National team at the 2009 European U20 Women's Championships in Poland. The Germans finished in eighth place in the tournament, a marked improvement from the 12th-place finish last year. In nine games, Trogele finished second on the team with a 10.7 scoring average. She also led the Germans in rebounding (6.4), steals (1.9) and blocks (0.6). She connected on 46.3% of her shots (37–80) and 88% of her free throws (22–25).
July 23: Basketball head coach Coquese Washington gave birth to a baby girl. Her name is Rhaiyna Kamille Brown. Her daughter was born at 2:40 p.m. on July 23, is 20.5 inches long and weighs seven pounds, five ounces.
August 21: The 2009–10 preseason candidates list for the Women's Wooden Award was released, naming 31 student athletes. Tyra Grant from Penn State was one of the candidates.

Regular season

Roster
Mia Nickson will sit out the season due to NCAA transfer rules. Tyra Grant and Julia Trogele are the only starters from the previous season that are returning.

Schedule
The Nittany Lions competed in the Maine Classic from November 27–28. The WBCA Pink Zone at Penn State was held on January 24.

Schedule and results

|-
!colspan=9| Exhibition

|-
!colspan=9| Regular Season

|-
!colspan=9| Big Ten tournament

|-
!colspan=9| WNIT

Player stats

Postseason

NCAA basketball tournament

Awards and honors

Preseason All-Big Ten Coaches Team
Tyra Grant, Sr., F, PSU

Preseason All-Big Ten Media Team
Tyra Grant, Sr., F, PSU

Team players drafted into the WNBA

References

External links
Official Site

Penn State Lady Lions basketball seasons
Penn State